Matthew Baker (born February 25, 1988 in Bethlehem, Pennsylvania) is an American soccer player.

Career

College and Amateur
Baker attended Allentown Central Catholic High School. He set school records for most goals in a season (40) most career assists (43), goals (76) and points. He earned First Team All-State, First Team All-Area and All-Lehigh Division I First Team honors. He also was named to the Salisbury All-Tournament Team. He ranked among the region’s all-time top 20 in both goals and points, becoming the 40thknown player in region to score 30-plus goals in a season. Led the Lehigh Valley Conference and Colonial League in scoring and received Lehigh Division Honorable Mention honors as a sophomore. Led team to a second-place finish in district play in 2004-05 and four years played.

Baker joined the Pitt Panthers after graduating from Allentown Central Catholic High School for four years of college soccer at the University of Pittsburgh. He was his team's team leader in points and goals in his freshman year in 2006 as well as earning Big East Rookie of the Week Honors. In 2009, Baker was voted team captain and earned Most Valuable Player. He was a Big East Academic All-Star all four years. In 2009, he earned a spot on the Big East Academic All Star team. He was also selected as the University of Pittsburgh's Male Scholar Athlete of the Year.

During his college years Baker also played for Pennsylvania Stoners and the Pocono Snow in the National Premier Soccer League, alongside his Riverhounds teammate Alex Weekes. The Stoners went on to win the NPSL National Championship in 2008.

Professional
Baker turned professional in 2010 when he signed to play for the Pittsburgh Riverhounds in the USL Second Division. He made his professional debut on April 17, 2010 in the team's 2010 season opener against the Real Maryland Monarchs, and went on to make 18 appearances for the Riverhounds in his debut pro season. He earned Team of the Week honors and finished the season with three assists.

Baker asked to be released by the Riverhounds at the end of the 2010 season to pursue a career in Brazil. He received a contract offer from Flamengo Paraibano of the second division in Brazil. Living conditions forced the team to fold leaving Baker without a team. He signed to play for Reading United in the USL Premier Development League in 2011. Baker has also played in Philadelphia Union Reserve team matches.

References

External links
Pittsburgh bio

1988 births
Living people
American soccer players
Pittsburgh Panthers men's soccer players
Pittsburgh Riverhounds SC players
Reading United A.C. players
USL Second Division players
USL League Two players
Sportspeople from Bethlehem, Pennsylvania
Soccer players from Pennsylvania
American expatriate sportspeople in Brazil
Association football midfielders